Banco de España is a station on Line 2 of the Madrid Metro located in the Center of Madrid in the Calle de Alcalá, next to the Plaza de Cibeles, perpendicular to the Paseo del Prado.

History 
Banco de España station opened on 14 June 1924 with the first stretch of Line 2 between Sol and Ventas. 
The station is named after Bank of Spain building located nearby. Another prominent monuments situated near this station are: Cibeles Fountain, Palacio de Linares, Círculo de Bellas Artes, The Communications Palace (currently the Madrid City Hall), the church of San José, the Palacio de Buenavista, the building of the Interior Ministry of Spain and the Fine Arts Theatre.

References 

Line 2 (Madrid Metro) stations
Calle de Alcalá
Railway stations in Spain opened in 1924